Bev is a canned wine supplier based in Venice, California. The company is known for being women-owned and run in a male-dominated industry. 

The company was founded in 2017 by Alix Peabody.

History
Bev was founded in 2017 by Alix Peabody, who had worked at hedge fund Bridgewater Associates and at a San Francisco tech recruiting company, and was pursuing a MFA in screenwriting at USC. Large unexpected health bills led her to start fundraising, by hosting ticketed parties. While hosting, she identified an opportunity in the beverage market for a woman owned business targeting women. Through her connections she got in touch with a supplier of rosé. She cashed out some retirement savings, and began marketing the wine in cans. Initial sales were through viral marketing and online. The company eventually signed a distribution deal with wine and spirits distributor Southern Glazer's Wine and Spirits.

In April 2019, San Francisco-based venture capital firm Founders Fund led a $7 million investment round in Bev, its first in an alcohol company. The funds were to be used to expand the company's sales teams as it expanded nationally into retail stores. 

In January 2020, Hollywood personalities and investor sisters Erin and Sara Foster announced that Bev was their first investment, citing their desire to invest in female-owned businesses.

In February 2021, the company signed a distribution deal with E & J Gallo Winery to distribute Bev's wines nationally. The deal would allow the wines to be sold in retailers including Target and Bevmo. In June, founder Peabody was recognized by advertising trade publication AdAge as its Creativity Awards Visionary/Founder of the year, for her efforts to redefine the traditional adult beverage industry. Also in 2021, Peabody was named to business publication Inc's Female Founders 100 list.

Products 
 Bev distributes canned wine spritzers marketed to women. The 8.5 oz. brightly colored cans are promoted as 100-calorie, zero-sugar and low-carb. The cans come in six varieties: Gris (California Pinot Grigio), Rosé (California Rose Wine), Glam (Sparkling Rose Wine), Blanc (California Sauvignon Blanc), Noir (California Pinot Noir) and Glitz (Sparking White Wine).

References

External links
 

Wine
Alcoholic drinks
American companies established in 2017
Companies based in California
21st-century American businesswomen
21st-century American businesspeople